Lost in Shangri-la: A True Story of Survival, Adventure, and the Most Incredible Rescue Mission of World War II is a 2011 non-fiction book by American author Mitchell Zuckoff about a US military airplane called "The Gremlin Special", which crashed on May 13, 1945 in Netherlands New Guinea, and the subsequent rescue of the survivors. Because it involved a female WAC Corporal lost in the jungle with "savages", the public became keenly interested in following the story. It was written about in the November 1945 issue of Reader's Digest magazine, and many other press channels.  In 2011 Zuckoff published a modern retelling based on interviews with surviving Americans and New Guineans, and other previously unpublished information.

Background

The airplane started from Hollandia in Netherlands New Guinea (at the time part of Netherlands Indies, nowadays Indonesia) as a pleasure flight over a remote valley in New Guinea with 24 passengers, but only three people survived the crash: WAC corporal Margaret Hastings, sergeant Kenneth Decker and lieutenant John McCollom. They were later rescued by paratroopers who carried them out in gliders.

The name "Shangri-La" was given by the press, lifted from the 1933 novel Lost Horizon. The "Gremlin" in the plane's name was borrowed from the myth of Gremlins, which are often associated to mishaps and mechanical troubles of airplanes.

Awards and honors
Salon and Kirkus Reviews named Lost in Shangri-La one of the best nonfiction books of 2011.

Adaptation 
In 2019, 3000 Pictures purchased the film rights to adapt Lost in Shangri-La into a film with the screenplay co-written by Zuckoff and Richard Abate.

See also

References

External links 

 Kirkus Reviews starred review
 Library Journal review
 NPR Review: "A WWII Survival Epic Unfolds Deep In 'Shangri-La'"
 Publishers Weekly starred review
 Washington Post review

1945 short stories
2011 non-fiction books
Works about Papua New Guinea
HarperCollins books